Giulio Gallera (born 28 April 1969 in Milan) is an Italian politician.

Biography 
Born in Milan, he graduated in law at the University of Milan in 1995, passing the bar exam in 1998.

He started his political career in the youth group of the Italian Liberal Party, and in 1994 he was among the founders of Forza Italia. After serving as city councilor in Milan, he was elected to the Lombard Regional Council in 2012. He has been appointed Regional Minister for Health and Welfare since 2016, first by President of Lombardy  Roberto Maroni and then by his successor Attilio Fontana in 2018. In 2021, after drawing criticism over Lombardy's response to the COVID-19 pandemic, he was replaced with Letizia Moratti. In May 2021 he became chairman of the Programme and Budget Commission.

References

External links 
Regione Lombardia: Giulio Gallera
Giulio Gallera on WikiMilano

Members of the Regional Council of Lombardy
University of Milan alumni
Living people
1969 births